The Touro College of Osteopathic Medicine (TouroCOM) is a private medical school with a main campus in the neighborhood of Central Harlem in New York City and an additional campus in Middletown, New York. It is a division of Touro College and University System. 

The college's inaugural class graduated in 2011. It was the first medical school to open in New York State in nearly 30 years and is the first osteopathic medical school with a special emphasis on training minority doctors.  TouroCOM currently has a student body of about 1080 students.

TouroCOM has a stated goal of particularly identifying and recruiting students willing to make a commitment to practice in underserved communities such as Harlem and Middletown. The neighborhood has been designated by the federal government as underserved by medical professionals. Community service events such as free health counseling, screenings, and flu shots are offered to local residents by students and faculty several times a year.

History
Touro College of Osteopathic Medicine opened in 2007 in Harlem, New York. It was the first medical school to open in New York State in nearly 30 years and is the first osteopathic medical school with a special emphasis on training minority doctors.  The college's inaugural class graduated in 2011. The Middletown campus graduated their first class in 2018. TouroCOM is a division of Touro College. Touro College has medical programs in other states including California and Nevada.

Academics
TouroCOM offers two degree-granting programs, a Doctor of Osteopathic Medicine (DO) and a Master of Science in Interdisciplinary Studies (MS).

The DO program curriculum follows the traditional division of medical education in the United States. The first two preclinical years include basic science courses such as anatomy, biochemistry, and physiology as well as courses to establish a foundation in osteopathic manipulative techniques.  The latter two years revolve around the clinical clerkships where students train in hospitals and facilities around the New York metropolitan area. TouroCOM is the first medical school to administer all testing online.  Lectures are pre-recorded and class time is dedicated to stimulating critical thinking approaches and solving challenges through "clicker sessions."

The MS program offers a "Masters to DO" pathway which allows students to attend science courses alongside DO students.  A provisional acceptance into the medical school is given at the end of the first year if certain requirements including GPA, MCAT score and other achievements are met.

Approximately 60 percent of Touro College of Osteopathic Medicine students work in primary care following graduation.

Campuses
The Touro College of Osteopathic Medicine Harlem Campus is located at 230 West 125th Street, diagonally across from the historic Apollo Theater in Manhattan's Harlem neighborhood. The facility provides approximately  devoted to medical education. The school contains amphitheater-style lecture halls, classrooms, offices, support facilities, clinical skills training facilities, and laboratories. The virtual library includes more than 50,000 books and 1,000 journals, 26,000 electronic journals, virtual resources, more than 80 computer workstations, multimedia areas, and reading spaces.  The Campus is located two blocks east of the A, B, and D train and one block west of the 2 and 3 train.

In August 2014, a larger campus that occupies 110,000 square feet of space in the Horton complex opened in Middletown, New York. The inaugural class consisted of 135 students, and graduated in 2018. The campus has since started a Master of Science in Interdisciplinary Studies (MS) program. TouroCOM launched MedAchieve Scholars in 2012, a program that encourages students from underrepresented groups to pursue careers in science, technology, engineering, and mathematics.

In 2009, students from Touro College of Osteopathic Medicine worked with DKMS Americas (along with assistance from the Harlem community and the Apollo Theater) to arrange a Bone Marrow Registration Drive that resulted in about 200 new bone marrow registrants. The drive was inspired by the need to find a bone marrow donor match for Jasmina Anema, a six-year-old African American girl fighting leukemia, who died in 2010.

In 2021, Touro College & University System and Benefis Health System planned to break ground on a new Touro College of Osteopathic Medicine campus in Great Falls, Montana. The school is located next to Benefis where students will do clinical rotations. The school will have up to 125 students each year.

Admissions 
Applicants apply through the American Association of Colleges of Osteopathic Medicine Application Service (AACOMAS).  For the Class of 2020, TouroCOM received 6574 applications for 292 first year positions between the Harlem and Middletown campuses. No early decision program is offered.

Students
TouroCOM currently has a student body of about 1080 students.  Over 200 underrepresented minority students have matriculated since the school's inception in 2007. In 2015, the NAACP recognized the Harlem campus's efforts to increase the number of underrepresented minorities in medicine through the MedAchieve afterschool mentoring program, the Mentoring in Medicine program that brings local high school students into TouroCOM's anatomy labs, and the Fund for Underrepresented minority students.

Clinical Rotation Sites 
Core rotation sites for third and fourth year medical students include:

 Cornerstone Family Health Care
 Good Samaritan Hospital Medical Center
 Harlem Cardiology of Madison Avenue
 Hemant Patel, MD, PC
 Institute for Family Health
 Kingsbrook Jewish Medical Center
 Middletown Medical Group
 Nyack Hospital
 Oneida Health
 Orange Regional Medical Center
 Putnam Hospital Center
 Rockland Psychiatric Center
 Southampton Hospital
 St. Joseph's - New Island Hospital
 St. Joseph's Health
 St. Luke's Cornwall Hospital
 Staten Island University Hospital
 Vassar Brothers Medical Center

Residency Match 
Upon completion of their medical education, students apply to residency or internship programs throughout the country through the National Residency Match Program (NRMP), AOA Match, Military Match, or other matching programs.

Accreditation
Touro College of Osteopathic Medicine is accredited by the Middle States Commission on Higher Education and received the status of initial award of accreditation from the American Osteopathic Association's Commission on Osteopathic College Accreditation. (COCA).

Notable faculty
 Conrad Fischer, MD
 David Paterson
Jay Sexter
Jeff Gardere

See also
 Touro College
 Osteopathic medicine in the United States

References

External links
 Touro College of Osteopathic Medicine

Universities and colleges in New York City
Osteopathic medical schools in the United States
Educational institutions established in 2007
Universities and colleges in Manhattan
2007 establishments in New York City
Touro University System
Schools of medicine in New York City